Swartbooisdrift is a small settlement in Kunene Region in the north of Namibia. It is situated on the banks of the Kunene River, directly at the Angolan border on the minor road D3700 and falls within the Epupa electoral constituency. Swartbooisdrift is populated by 150 - 300 semi-nomadic people of Himba and Herero descent, depending on the season.

The settlement is named after Petrus Swartbooi, one of the tribal chief captains of the Swartbooi Nama who raided the area in the 1890s.

Swartbooisdrift has some historic significance as the place where Dorsland Trekkers crossed the Kunene River in 1881 to move into Angola. In commemoration of this migratory movement the Dorsland Trekkers Monument has been erected on a hill just outside the settlement.

Swartbooisdrift was the administrative centre of the Kaokoland from 1925 to 1939. Afterwards, administrative control of the area shifted to Ohopoho (today's Opuwo). During that time a police station was operational at the settlement. From 1938 to 1942, the settlement was one of a number of guard posts set up on all shallow stretches of the Kunene to prevent the spread of cattle lung disease into Namibia.

Swartbooisdrift is a poor settlement with no access to electricity or clean water but features a clinic and a school. People live from subsistence cattle farming. There is a sodalite mine to the east.

References

External links
 Wilkinsons World Picture of the Dorsland Trekkers Monument

Populated places in the Kunene Region